Tinok shenishba (Hebrew: תינוק שנשבה, literally, "captured infant") is a talmudical term that refers to a Jew who sins inadvertently as a result of having been raised without an appreciation for the thought and practices of Judaism. Its status is widely applied in contemporary Orthodox Judaism to unaffiliated Jews today.

Terminology

Tinok shenishba is short for Tinok shenishba bein hanochrim, which translates as, "An infant captured [and consequently raised] among gentiles." This is a case where the individual in question is not responsible for his actions and sins due to his being raised in a place or situation where the Jewish law is unknown to him. An individual doesn't literally have to have been "captured" as an infant to fall within the definition of a tinok shenishba but rather, even if the child were raised without religious guidance it would be considered tinok shenishba.

Application in Jewish law
Because a tinok shenishba was not raised with proper guidance towards appreciation of Jewish life, law, and ritual, they are not accountable for not living in accordance with the Torah. If this Jew would encounter and re-find his Jewish brothers and their Torah, he must be welcomed back and taught the correct way to live life as a Jew.

Codification in the Talmud

The concept of tinok shenishba is first mentioned in the Talmud. In Shevu'ot 5a, the Gemara states that responsibility for inadvertent transgression is only placed upon an individual who knew the correct law at two points in time (before the transgression and the remembrance after the transgression) and forgot the law sometime in between. If that individual knew the law and subsequently forgot the law, and never again remembered or received a reminder, they would be an unwitting transgressor. Similarly, if an individual never knew the law in the first place, and subsequently learned the law, they would also be an unwitting transgressor. This latter example would fall under the category of a tinok shenishba.

In Shabbat 68b, there is a dispute between Abba Arikha and Samuel of Nehardea on one side, and Yochanan bar Nafcha and Shimon ben Lakish on the other, regarding in what type of situations a tinok shenishba (or a convert who was similarly raised among gentiles) is responsible for punishment and/or repentance along with the offering of animal sacrifices in the Holy Temple upon transgression of the laws of Shabbat and their subsequent return to Judaism. The halacha follows that a tinok shenishba would only be required to do one act of repentance for their multiple violations of the law, because all the violations stemmed from a single instance of not knowing the proper laws to obey.

Practical relevance in the modern era
Maimonides speaks out strongly against those who deny the validity of the Oral Torah, including the Mishnah and the Talmud, labeling them as heretics. This would include Karaite Jews. He claims they deserve neither witnesses, warning, nor judges to be punished according to Jewish law. Rather, anyone who removes them from existence merits great reward as one who removed an obstacle from the proper course of Jewish belief and practice.

However, Maimonides expresses concern for the offspring of such individuals, and excludes them from those who deserve such punishment because they participated unwittingly in their denial of the Oral Law. While they are indeed sinners, he declares them unintentional participants in their lack of adherence to Jewish law and belief, similar to the case of a tinok shenishba.  Rather than be pushed away, such individuals are to be drawn into the Jewish community and taught the proper way so they can become observant, frum members of community.

The notion that unaffiliated and unobservant Jews are unwitting sinners who should be taught the Jewish laws and customs and welcomed into the Torah community is the basis for the many outreach organizations (Kiruv) that exist in the modern era, including Chabad, Aish Hatorah, Ohr Somayach and Gateways.

Hasidic mysticism
The Baal Shem Tov (1698–1760), founder of the revivalist Hasidic movement, brought a 

Adjusting the former hierarchy of values, the Baal Shem Tov taught that the simple, sincere common Jewish folk could be closer to God than the scholars, for whom pride may affect their scholarly achievements, and the elite scholars could envy and learn lessons in devotion from the uneducated community. The Baal Shem Tov and later Hasidic masters made deveikut the central principle in Jewish spirituality, teaching that the sincere divine soul essence of the artless Jew reflects the essential divine simplicity. In contemporary Hasidic views of outreach to unobservant Jews, this mystical emphasis implies that the value of a small deed of observance by unaffiliated Jews would be able to set aside one's own spiritual development, as the Baal Shem Tov taught, "a soul may come into the World for 70 years in order to do a single deed of kindness to another person".

See also
 Baal teshuva
 Jewish secularism
 Jewish schisms
 Off the derech
 List of Jewish atheists and agnostics

References

External links
 Tinok Shenishbah, by Rabbi Julian Sinclair, July 28, 2010; Jewish Chronicle Online

Jewish law principles
Jewish theology
Orthodox Jewish outreach